Qurd is a studio album by the Dayirman. The album contains fifteen compositions based on Azerbaijani hip hop.

Content

Subject matter 
Qurd is a reflective album, featuring Dayirman's more personal and serious side. This change gives the album a lighter tone, a departure from his previous albums. One of the most noticeable changes is the generally lighter lyrical content. Over the course of the album, the group touches on the issues of Karabakh in hip hop ("Ya Qarabağ, Ya Ölüm"), Pan-Turkism ("Turk turke dastak"), the Turan and Tengrism ("Qurd").

Track listing

Critical reception
Qurd received mostly positive ratings from most music critics. Dayirman been praised for their patriotic elements in their songs and helping popularising Azerbaijani hip hop.

See also
Mugham
Meykhana

References 

2001 albums
Dayirman albums